Robert Mulholland (October 13, 1838 – February 21, 1917) was an Ontario businessman and political figure. He represented Northumberland West in the Legislative Assembly of Ontario as a Conservative member from 1883 to 1886.

He was born near Cobourg in Upper Canada, the son of John Mulholland, an Irish immigrant, and studied at the Commercial College in Oswego, New York. He worked for a merchant in Baltimore for three years and was then given charge of a general store in Roseneath in Northumberland County owned by the same merchant. He also served as postmaster for Rosemeath. In 1857, with Alexander Kennedy, he purchased a general store in the nearby town of Alderville. In 1859, he married Mary Kennedy, his partner's sister. Around 1865, that business was sold and Mulholland moved to Cobourg where he opened a hardware and grocery store with Peter Brown. He also established a dry good business in partnership with William Graham. Mulholland served on the Cobourg town council.

He died in February 1917 at Clifton Springs, New York.

His son Robert Alexander managed a branch of the firm Mulholland & Brown in Port Hope and later served in the Canadian Senate.

References

External links 
A Cyclopæedia of Canadian biography : being chiefly men of the time ... GM Rose (1886)

1838 births
1917 deaths
People from Northumberland County, Ontario
Progressive Conservative Party of Ontario MPPs